The Variety Club Celebrity Classic was a women's professional golf tournament on the Ladies European Tour held in Berkshire, England. It was first played in 1988 and held annually until 1990.

Winners

Source:

References

External links
Ladies European Tour

Former Ladies European Tour events
Golf tournaments in England
Defunct sports competitions in England
Recurring sporting events established in 1988
Recurring sporting events disestablished in 1990